Meghann Riepenhoff (born 1979) is an American photographer, living in Bainbridge Island, Washington, and San Francisco, California, who makes camera-less cyanotypes. She has produced the books Littoral Drift + Ecotone (2018) and Ice (2022). Her work is held in the collections of the High Museum of Art and San Francisco Museum of Modern Art and in 2018 she received a Guggenheim Fellowship.

Life and work
Riepenhoff is from Atlanta, GA. She received a BFA in photography from the University of Georgia, and an MFA from San Francisco Art Institute. She lives in Bainbridge Island, Washington, and San Francisco, California.

She makes camera-less cyanotypes in collaboration with the landscape and the ocean. "Riepenhoff utilises waves, rain, wind and sediment in her process, creating physical inscriptions through the direct contact of these natural phenomena with her photographic materials".

Publications
Littoral Drift + Ecotone. Santa Fe, New Mexico: Radius; New York City: Yossi Milo, 2018. .
Ice. Santa Fe, New Mexico: Radius; New York City: Yossi Milo, 2022. Photography by Riepenhoff, text by Rebecca Solnit. .

Group exhibitions
Cyanotypes: Photography's Blue Period, Worcester Art Museum, Worcester, MA, 2016
New Territory: Landscape Photography Today, Denver Art Museum, Denver, CO, 2018

Awards
2018: Guggenheim Fellowship from the John Simon Guggenheim Memorial Foundation

Collections
Riepenhoff's work is held in the following permanent collections:
High Museum of Art, New York: 2 prints (as of 14 March 2023)
San Francisco Museum of Modern Art, San Francisco, CA: 1 print (as of 14 March 2023)
Worcester Art Museum, Worcester, MA: 1 print (as of 14 March 2023)

See also
Anna Atkins

References

External links

21st-century American photographers
American women photographers
Photographers from Georgia (U.S. state)
Artists from Atlanta
San Francisco Art Institute alumni
University of Georgia alumni
Living people
1979 births